Neil Graff is a former quarterback in the National Football League. He was drafted in the sixteenth round of the 1972 NFL Draft by the Minnesota Vikings.

He later played with the New England Patriots for two seasons, making his first appearance in 1974 during a Patriots blowout win. Backup quarterback Dick Shiner came in and led an 80 yard touchdown drive when the game was already out of hand and Graff came in thereafter to finish the game. In 1975 the Patriots struggled as they had for most of the early seventies finishing 3-11. Graff made his only two NFL starts for the Patriots throwing two touchdowns and three interceptions.

Later he was selected in the 1976 NFL Expansion Draft by the Seattle Seahawks and split that season as a member of the Seahawks and the Pittsburgh Steelers, though he did not see any playing time in a regular season game with Seattle. He played the following year with the Steelers appearing in four games and being dressed for their playoff appearance against eventual AFC champion Denver. In 1978 he played for the Green Bay Packers but did not make an appearance during the regular season. 

One of two NFL quarterbacks born in the state of South Dakota, The other being HOF player, Norm Van Brocklin, born in Parade, SD. Graff is an inductee in the South Dakota Sports Hall of Fame.

References

Sportspeople from Sioux Falls, South Dakota
New England Patriots players
Seattle Seahawks players
Pittsburgh Steelers players
Green Bay Packers players
American football quarterbacks
Wisconsin Badgers football players
1950 births
Living people